The administrative structure of the government of the Empire of Japan on the eve of the Second World War broadly consisted of the Cabinet, the civil service, local and prefectural governments, the governments-general of Chosen (Korea) and Formosa (Taiwan) and the colonial offices. It underwent several changes during the wartime years, and was entirely reorganized when the Empire of Japan was officially dissolved in 1947.

Central government

The main organ of the central government was the Cabinet (naikaku), which consisted of the Prime Minister or Premier (naikaku sōri-daijin) and, before 1947, 12 to 14 Ministers of State, each heading a ministry (department). Under each Minister of State were two Vice-Ministers, a Permanent Vice-Minister responsible for administration and a Parliamentary Vice-Minister responsible for representing the ministry in the Diet. Each Parliamentary Vice-Minister was assisted by a Parliamentary Councillor. Each ministry comprised several bureaux, each headed by a director who oversaw several bureau sections. Each section was headed by a section chief.

The Prime Minister's Office
Several bureaux and officials were directly responsible to the Prime Minister. In 1939, the Prime Minister's Office consisted of the Prime Minister, his Chief Secretary, and the Planning Board and several separate bureaux, each headed by a president or director who reported directly to the Prime Minister:

The Planning Board (Headed by a President): Established in October 1937; responsible for submitting recommendations to the Prime Minister on matters of national importance, and coordinating their implementation. 
Bureau of Legislation (Headed by a President): Responsible for drafting legislation and ordinances.
Bureau of Decorations (Headed by a President): Responsible for decorations and their annuities.
Bureau for Manchurian Affairs (Headed by a President): Established in December 1934. Responsible for all matters concerning the Kwangtung Leased Territory and the South Manchuria Railway Zone

There were also four separate bureaux for Information, the Tohoku (North-Eastern Districts), Information and Pensions, each headed by a director reporting to the Prime Minister.

As well, the Prime Minister headed numerous committees as necessary.

The Cabinet
Headed by the Prime Minister, until 1942 the Cabinet consisted of the following ministries (departments):

Ministry of Foreign Affairs (Gaimu-sho): located at Kasumigaseki 1-chome, Kojimachi-ku, Tokyo
Ministry of Home Affairs (Naimu-sho): located at Sakuradamachi, Kojimachi-ku, Tokyo
Ministry of Finance (Okura-sho): located at Otamachi 1-chome, Kojimachi-ku, Tokyo
Ministry of War (Army Ministry) (Rikugun-sho): located at Nagatacho, Kojimachi-ku, Tokyo
Ministry of the Navy (Navy Ministry) (Kaigun-sho): located at Kasumigaseki 2-chome, Kojimachi-ku, Tokyo
Ministry of Justice (Shiho-sho): located at West Hibiya-cho, Kojimachi-ku, Tokyo
Ministry of Education (Mombu-sho): located at Sannen-cho, Kojimachi-ku, Tokyo
Ministry of Agriculture and Forestry (Norin-sho): located at Otemachi, Kojimachi-ku, Tokyo
Ministry of Commerce and Industry (Shoko-sho): located at Kobiki-cho, 10-chome, Kyobashi-ku, Tokyo
Ministry of Communications (Teishin-sho): located at Otemachi 2-chome, Kojimachi-ku, Tokyo
Ministry of Railways (Tetsudo-sho): located at Otemachi 1-chome, Kojimachi-ku, Tokyo
Ministry of Overseas Affairs (Takamu-sho): located at West Hibiya-cho, Kojimachi-ku, Tokyo
Ministry of Health and Social Affairs (Kosei-sho)

In November 1942, the Ministry of the Greater Co-Prosperity Sphere (Daitōa-shō) was formed by merging the earlier Ministry of Overseas Affairs with the East Asia Department and South Pacific Department of the Foreign Ministry and the East Asia Development Board, formed in 1938 as a separate cabinet-level agency.
In November 1943, the Ministry of Munitions (Gunju-sho) was formed from the Board of Planning of the Ministry of Commerce and Industry

Ministry of Foreign Affairs
Responsible for administration of diplomatic affairs and diplomats and the protection of commercial interests and overseas Japanese. Until 1942, structured as follows:

East Asiatic Bureau:
First Section: Diplomatic affairs related to China, Hong Kong and Macau
Second Section: Diplomatic affairs related to Thailand and the protection and control of overseas Japanese in Thailand, China, Hong Kong and Macau
Third Section: Diplomatic affairs related to Manchukuo
European and Asiatic Bureau:
First Section: Diplomatic affairs related to the Soviet Union, Finland, the Baltic states, Turkey, Poland, the Empire of Iran and the Kingdom of Afghanistan
Second Section: Diplomatic affairs related to all European and other nations, which are not overseen by any other bureau or section.
American Bureau:
First Section: Diplomatic affairs related to the Dominion of Canada and the United States of America and its territories
Second Section: Diplomatic affairs related to all Central and South American nations
Third Section: Matters related to emigration and passports
Commercial Bureau:
First Section: Institutions and policies of trade and navigation
Second Section: Promotion and protection of trade and navigation
Third Section: Commercial affairs and reports
Treaties Bureau:
First Section: Drafting, interpreting, sanctioning, publishing and revising treaties with foreign nations
Second Section: International judicial matters
Third Section: League of Nations 
Information Bureau:
First Section: Daily news and broadcasting
Second Section: Publications, foreign news agencies, propaganda and international meetings
Third Section: Distribution of diplomatic information 
Investigations Bureau:
First Section: General business and diplomatic facts
Second Section: Records and materials
Third Section: Diplomatic and commercial investigations in Asia and the Near East
Fourth Section: Diplomatic and commercial investigations in Europe and Oceania
Fifth Section: Investigations in North and South America
Cultural Works Bureau: Promotion and assistance with cultural matters relating to China

Ministry of Home Affairs
Responsible for shrines, prefectural administration, elections, police, public works, town planning and publication and copyrights. Supervised the police and prefectural governors.

Bureau of Shrines
Bureau of Local Affairs: Elections, local public matters of financial and economic consequence, prefectural conscription and requisition, forests, reclamation and like matters in Hokkaido
Bureau of Public Order: Police, printed matter and publications
Bureau of Public Works: Including those for prefectural governments
Bureau of Town and City Planning

The following were under the direct supervision of the Minister:
Disabled Soldiers' Asylum
National Shrines Building Office
Police Educational Institute
National House of Correction for the Improvement of Juvenile Criminals
National Leprosaria

Ministry of Finance
Responsible for accounts, payments, receipts of public monies, taxation, bonds, coins, management and sale of negotiable instruments in custody of the government, banking, trusts, mutual loan associations and prefectural and local finances

Bureau of Accounts: The national budget, accounts, treasury matters
Bureau of Taxation: Taxes and customs and excise tariffs
Bureau of Fund Employment: Employment of national funds, administration of national treasury monies, coinage and currency circulation, national loans, accident and relief funds, deposits and negotiable securities, annuities and public loans floated by public associations.
Banking Bureau: Ordinary, special and savings banks, general banking affairs, cooperative societies and city credit unions

The following were under the direct supervision of the Minister:
Deposits Bureau: Management of the deposits of ordinary subjects of the middle and lower classes
Foreign Exchange Control Bureau
National Property Bureau: All matters pertaining to national properties
Bureau of the Mint (in Osaka): Minting of coins and medals, casting of national orders and decorations and research on metals
Bureaux of Customs: Epidemic registrations, quarantines and medical examinations for persons entering the nation, customs duties, shipping controls
Customs Houses: Yokohama, Kobe, Osaka, Nagasaki, Moji, Nagoya and Hakodate
Bureaux of Revenue Superintendence: Matters concerning tax collection
Local Offices: Tokyo, Osaka, Sapporo, Sendai, Nagoya, Hiroshima, Kumamoto, Imperial Army and Imperial Navy
Monopolies Bureau: Administration of government monopolies on tobacco, salt, camphor and pure alcohol
Brewing Laboratory
Committees on Tariff Petition Examination, National Property Survey, Building Central Office and Tariff Investigation

References

Former government ministries of Japan
Politics of the Empire of Japan
1945 disestablishments in Japan